Grassholme Reservoir is a large reservoir in County Durham, England. It supplies water for Teesdale and Teesside and is owned by Northumbrian Water. Its main recreational use is as an angling centre.

See also

 List of reservoirs and dams in the United Kingdom

Drinking water reservoirs in England
Reservoirs in County Durham